KROS College, is a college in Kohima, Nagaland, India. The college was established in 2006. It offers undergraduate courses in Arts and Commerce and is affiliated to Nagaland University.

Departments

Arts and Commerce
English
History
Political Science 
Sociology
Economics
Education
Commerce

Accreditation
The college is recognized by the University Grants Commission (UGC) and accredited by National Assessment and Accreditation Council (NAAC).

References

External links
KROS College Official Website

Education in Kohima
Colleges affiliated to Nagaland University
Universities and colleges in Nagaland
Educational institutions established in 2006
2006 establishments in Nagaland